Raman Thediya Seethai is a 1972 Indian Tamil-language romance film, directed by P. Neelakantan and written by Sornam from a story by Maa. Raa. The film stars M. G. Ramachandran and Jayalalithaa. It is a remake of the 1969 Kannada film Gandondu Hennaru. The film ran for more than 100 days in theatres and it became a box office success. Jayalalithaa won the Tamil Nadu Cinema Fan Award for Best Actress

Plot 
S. J. Raman, a rich industrialist tries to find his soul mate. His future ideal wife has to possess absolutely 6 virtues, which a nice old couple revealed him in the bend of a way. Raman already knows the one who could fill his heart, make it happy. Her name is Seetha, a charming representative in cosmetics. But regrettably, during the preparations of their marriage, outer elements apparently annoyed by this union, make everything prevent that it occur. Provided with his invaluable notebook containing 6 criteria, the odyssey of Raman is only beginning...

Cast 
 M. G. Ramachandran as S. J. Raman
 Jayalalithaa as Seetha, Rambha and Rani
 M. N. Nambiar as Babu Bhairavan
 S. A. Ashokan as Godhanraj
 V. K. Ramasamy as Siva Shankar
 Nagesh as Krishnan (Kishtan)
 V. S. Raghavan as Karmeghan, Seetha's father
 O. A. K. Thevar as Singamuthu, the retired military man
 Manorama as Samoundhi
 G. Sakunthala as The aunty
 Ragini (Guest-star) as the actress and the dancer of the play, disguised as a man ("Yea Annaa...")
 Rama Prabha as Krishnan's love interest
 V. Gopalakrishnan as Police inspector
 Usilai Mani as Housekeeper
 Idichappuli Selvaraj as Barber
 Karikol Raju
 Gundu Karuppaiah as Housekeeper

Production 
Raman Thediya Seethai is the second film produced by the Madurai-based Jayanthi Films. Some scenes were shot in Kashmir, including the song "Nalladhu Kanne".

Soundtrack 
The music was composed by M. S. Viswanathan.

Release and reception 
Raman Thediya Seethai was released on 13 April 1972, and ran for over 100 days in theatres. Ananda Vikatan favourably reviewed the film, saying its flaws would appear only if viewers start thinking deeply. Jayalalithaa won the Tamil Nadu Cinema Fan Award for Best Actress.

References

External links 

1970s Tamil-language films
1972 films
Films directed by P. Neelakantan
Films scored by M. S. Viswanathan
Films shot in Jammu and Kashmir
Indian romance films
Tamil remakes of Kannada films
1970s romance films